is a former Japanese football player.

Club statistics

References

External links

1984 births
Living people
Meiji University alumni
Association football people from Gunma Prefecture
Japanese footballers
J2 League players
Mito HollyHock players
Association football midfielders